Harlan Warde (born Harlan Ward Lufkin; November 6, 1917 – March 13, 1980) was a character actor active in television and movies.

Career
Warde showed up in supporting roles as detectives, doctors, and ministers. Warde made five guest appearances on Perry Mason between 1958–1966, primarily in law enforcement roles, such as Assistant District Attorney Harold Hanley in "The Case of the Haunted Husband", and Sgt. Roddin in the only color episode in 1966 entitled, "The Case of the Twice Told Twist". 

From 1958–62, he joined Chuck Connors in The Rifleman. Warde played John Hamilton, President of the North Fork Bank. He appeared in eighteen episodes of The Rifleman, making his debut in episode 8, “The Safeguard.” Over his 40-year-career in Hollywood, Warde appeared in over 180 films and television series, including multiple westerns.

Warde was cast in the historical role of future United States Secretary of War Edwin Stanton in the 1961 episode, "The Stolen City," on the syndicated anthology series, Death Valley Days, hosted by Stanley Andrews.

From 1962 to 1971, Warde was a member of the cast of the TV Western series The Virginian in the recurring role of Sheriff Brannon. Warde also appeared on The Big Valley in 1967 as a politician who is murdered in the episode entitled "Night Of The Executioner" and as Simon Winkler in "Opie and the Spoiled Kid" (1963), and as  Mr. Williams in "Fife, Realtor in 2 episodes of The Andy Griffith Show. Warde's last role was in the 1979 Rockford Files episode "A Different Drummer" playing the aging father of a shady doctor.

In 1969, Warde was one of a group of actors who made training videos for future doctors. A professor of neurology coached the actors on displaying symptoms of neurological diseases.

Filmography

1941: I Wanted Wings – Montgomery – Co-Pilot (uncredited)
1946: O.S.S. – Trainee (uncredited)
1947: Buck Privates Come Home – Sergeant – Medic #6 (uncredited)
1947: It Had to Be You – Atherton Huntley III (uncredited)
1948: To the Ends of the Earth – Harry Hardt (uncredited)
1948: Money Madness – Donald Harper
1948: On an Island with You – Lieutenant Commander (uncredited)
1948: Lady at Midnight – Ross Atherton
1948: Night Wind – Colonel (uncredited)
1948: Sons of Adventure – Art – Casting Director (uncredited)
1948: The Countess of Monte Cristo – Student (uncredited)
1948: He Walked by Night – Police Operator 27 (uncredited)
1948: Command Decision – Control Officer (uncredited)
1948: Wake of the Red Witch – Seaman Handling Diving Line (uncredited)
1949: State Department: File 649 – Rev. Dr. Morse 
1949: Flaxy Martin – McCLane, Assistant District Attorney (uncredited)
1949: The Undercover Man – Hoodlum (uncredited)
1949: Homicide – Monday Night's bartender (uncredited)
1949: Johnny Allegro – Coast Guard Officer (uncredited)
1949: The Fountainhead – Young man (uncredited)
1949: It's a Great Feeling – Publicity man (uncredited)
1949: Task Force – Timmy Kissell 
1949: The Doctor and the Girl – Anesthetist (uncredited)
1949: Prison Warden – Albert Gardner 
1949: Tokyo Joe – Lieutenant at airport (uncredited)
1949: Tell It to the Judge – Joe, Pete's Associate (uncredited)
1950: When Willie Comes Marching Home – Captain S. Robbins (uncredited)
1950: No Sad Songs for Me – Lee Corbett (uncredited)
1950: Customs Agent – Agent Perry (uncredited)
1950: Caged – Dr. Ashton (uncredited)
1950: The Asphalt Jungle – Reporter (uncredited)
1950: The Magnificent Yankee – Norton, Secretary (uncredited)
1950: David Harding, Counterspy – Hopkins (uncredited)
1950: The Flying Missile – Lieutenant Commander (uncredited)
1950: The Man Who Cheated Himself – Howard Frazer
1951: Operation Pacific – Dick (admiral's aide) (uncredited)
1951: Three Guys Named Mike – Meteorologist Hawkins (uncredited)
1951: Up Front – Lt. Myers (uncredited)
1951: I Was a Communist for the FBI – FBI Agent (uncredited)
1951: Her First Romance – Paul Powers 
1951: Smuggler's Gold – George Brewster 
1951: Criminal Lawyer – Byron Claymore (uncredited)
1951: Flying Leathernecks – Admiral's aide (uncredited)
1951: The Day the Earth Stood Still – Carson (uncredited)
1951: Close to My Heart – Father in Car (uncredited)
1952: Boots Malone – Private Investigator (uncredited)
1952: Loan Shark – Police Lt. White (uncredited)
1952: Without Warning! – Police Detective Sgt. Don Warde
1952: The Sniper – Mr. Harper (uncredited)
1952: Flat Top – Executive Officer (uncredited)
1952: Operation Secret – Major Dawson
1952: Above and Beyond – Chaplain Downey
1953: The Juggler – Shaul, Police Official (uncredited)
1953: Vice Squad – Det. Lacey
1953: Donovan's Brain – Treasury Agent Brooke 
1954: Hell and High Water – Photographer (uncredited)
1954: Dragnet – Doctor (uncredited)
1954: Down Three Dark Streets – FBI Agent Greg Barker
1954: Athena – TV show director (uncredited)
1955: Strategic Air Command – Duty Officer (uncredited)
1955: The Scarlet Coat – Captain with Col. Jameson (uncredited)
1955: I'll Cry Tomorrow – Stage Manager (uncredited)
1956: A Cry in the Night – Police Sgt. Vic Ogilvie (uncredited)
1956: Julie – Det. Pope
1957: The Wings of Eagles – Executive Officer (uncredited)
1957: Last of the Badmen – Green
1957: The Wings of Eagles – Executive Officer
1957: The Spirit of St. Louis – Boedecker (uncredited)
1957: The Monster That Challenged the World – Lt. Robert 'Clem' Clemens
1957: Beau James – Reporter (uncredited)
1957: Chicago Confidential – Lt. Traynor (uncredited)
1957: Bombardier B-52 (Bombers B-52) – Colonel John Baker, Head of Search and Rescue (uncredited)
1957: Sayonara – Consul (uncredited)
1958: Cry Terror! – Bert, Operative
1958: Hot Spell – Harry
1958: The Decks Ran Red – Vic
1958: The Buccaneer – Naval Aide to Patterson
1959: It Started with a Kiss – Air Force Major (uncredited)
1959: The Gazebo – Dr. Bradley, Elliott's Physician (uncredited)
1959–1961: Sea Hunt (TV Series) – USCG Cmdr. Ben White / Jonas White
1961: Cry for Happy – Chaplain
1962: A Public Affair – Herbert
1962: The Horizontal Lieutenant – Doctor (uncredited)
1962: Incident in an Alley – Ed, Assistant District Attorney (uncredited)
1962: Leave It to Beaver (TV Series) – Beaver's 8th grade teacher
1962–1972: Bonanza (TV Series) – Solicitor George Osgood / Tom Boyle / Nicholson / District Attorney / Nate Ogleby / Prosecutor Monroe / Constable
1963: Papa's Delicate Condition – Rev. Elkins (uncredited)
1964: Advance to the Rear – Maj. Hayward (CSA) (uncredited)
1964: Good Neighbor Sam – Attorney (uncredited)
1964: See How They Run (TV Movie) – Manley
1965: Zebra in the Kitchen – Uncle Travis (uncredited)
1965: Billie – Doctor Hall
1966: Incident at Phantom Hill – Minor Role (uncredited)
1966: Boy, Did I Get a Wrong Number! – Newscaster (uncredited)
1967: The Ride to Hangman's Tree – Brown (uncredited)
1969: Dragnet 1966 (TV Movie) – Officer Wilkins
1969: Hook, Line & Sinker – District Attorney (uncredited)
1970: Daniel Boone – Nicholas Burns 
1970: Tora! Tora! Tora! – Brig. Gen. Leonard T. Gerow (uncredited)
1970: The Aquarians (TV Movie) – Second Reporter
1971: Columbo (TV Series) – Paul Williams
1978: Corvette Summer – Las Vegas Police Lieutenant

References

External links

1917 births
1980 deaths
20th-century American male actors
American male film actors
American male television actors
Male actors from Los Angeles
Male Western (genre) film actors
Western (genre) television actors